Whitford, Pennsylvania is a populated place located southwest of Exton, Pennsylvania.  It is the location of the Whitford train station and the birthplace of Congressman Paul Dague.  According to the previous source, the Whitford Lodge was once located just west of Pennsylvania Route 100 on U.S. Route 30 (now U.S. Route 30 Business), which is now at the edge of a shopping center.

References

Unincorporated communities in Chester County, Pennsylvania
Unincorporated communities in Pennsylvania